The Bouleau River (: Birch River) is a salmon river in the Côte-Nord region of Quebec, Canada. 
It drains an area of the Canadian Shield plateau into the Gulf of Saint Lawrence.
The terrain includes large areas of bare rocks, as well as forests dominated by black spruce and balsam fir.

Location

Its source is to the north of Lake Bigot, west of Lake Nipisso.
The bedrock is Precambrian, covered in typical boreal vegetation.

The mouth of the Bouleau River is in the municipality of Rivière-au-Tonnerre in the Minganie Regional County Municipality.
The drainage basin covers parts of two regional county municipalities, within which it covers parts of four smaller administrative units:
Sept-Rivières Regional County Municipality (92.9%)
Unorganized territory of Rivière-Nipissis, Quebec (85.3%)
Town of Sept-Îles (7.6%)
Minganie Regional County Municipality (7.1%)
Unorganized territory of Lac-Jérôme (4.0%)
Municipality of Rivière-au-Tonnerre (3.2%)

Name

The name "Bouleau" (Betula) means birch, a tree that grows in cold and temperate regions, with white bark and small leaves, whose wood is used in carpentry, cabinet making and for the manufacture of paper.
The name was made official on 5 December 1968.

Terrain

The piedmont has rounded hills and wide valleys.

The bedrock of the watershed, which is mostly exposed in the northern part, consists of deformed magmatic rocks.
The north is dominated by gabbro, pyroxenite, troctolite and amphibolite.
The south has granite, pegmatite and migmatite.
The coastal fringe shows the influence of the postglacial Goldthwait Sea, which left large quantities of marine clay and silt sediments.
These have often been covered in sandy deltaic sediments.
The valley of the Bouleau holds glaciofluvial sediments.

Environment

A climate model indicates that annual average temperature would be  in the northern part of the watershed, while average annual rainfall would be about  throughout the watershed.

A map of the ecological regions of Quebec shows the Bouleau in sub-regions 6j-S, 6j-T and 6m-T of the east spruce/moss subdomain.
Forest cover consists of black spruce (Picea mariana) and balsam fir (Abies balsamea), with black spruce dominant on the coastal plain and north of the watershed, and mixed spruce/fir in the central region.
There was a large infestation of hemlock looper moths (Lambdina fiscellaria)  in the late 1990s and early 2000s that significantly damaged the fir trees.

Hydrology

Its greatest width is in the center section, where it reaches .
Due to the sloping terrain in most of the basin, wetlands such as ombrotrophic peatlands cover only 0.46% of the basin.
The network of streams and rivers is angular, conforming to fractures in the hard bedrock, with straight segments between right-angled forks.
In the plateau the rivers flow through narrow V-shaped valleys with very steep slopes.
In the piedmont the valleys have the U-shaped profile typical of glacial valleys, and the rivers wander through the glaciofluvial deposits.

The most important tributary is the Chiskal River, which drains the northwest of the basin.

There are a few pool areas, but this section mainly consists of rapids flowing over gravel, large rocks and bare rock.

Fish

The river holds anadromous Atlantic salmon  (Salmo salar), brook trout (Salvelinus fontinalis), and less commonly American eel (Anguilla rostrata) and three-spined stickleback (Gasterosteus aculeatus).
There are also alewife (Alosa pseudoharengus), Atlantic tomcod (Microgadus tomcod) and rainbow smelt (Osmerus mordax). 
The upstream section of the river is considered an exceptional habitat for young salmon. 
However, the large rapids  from the mouth limit their migration.

In May 2015 the Ministry of Forests, Wildlife and Parks of Quebec announced a sport fishing catch-and-release program for large salmon on sixteen of Quebec's 118 salmon rivers.
These were the Mitis, Laval, Pigou, Bouleau, Aux Rochers, Jupitagon, Magpie, Saint-Jean, Corneille, Piashti, Watshishou, Little Watshishou, Nabisipi, Aguanish and Natashquan rivers.
The Quebec Atlantic Salmon Federation said that the measures did not go nearly far enough in protecting salmon for future generations.
In view of the rapidly declining Atlantic salmon population catch-and-release should have been implemented on all rivers apart from northern Quebec.

In 2017 all salmon, large and small, had to be released on the Malbaie (Gaspé Peninsula), Pigou, Bouleau, Magpie, Coacoachou, Nétagamiou, Little Mecatina and Véco rivers. 
Only young salmon could be retained on 51 rivers, and limited retention of large salmon was allowed on 19 rivers.

Notes

Sources

Rivers of Côte-Nord